Simon Carr (born 7 November 1999) is an Irish tennis player. He is Ireland's No.1 player. Carr has a career high ATP singles ranking of No. 512 achieved on 3 February 2020. He also has a career high ATP doubles ranking of No. 507 achieved on 27 September 2021.

Early life and education
Simon Carr is the son of Tommy. He also played Gaelic football and rugby and swam when young but his mother got him into tennis at the age of nine and his grandfather is Seán Purcell. He studied in Mullingar C.B.S .

Career

Carr represents Ireland at the Davis Cup, where he has a W/L record of 5–4. Conor Niland gave Carr his first call-up to play against Denmark in February 2018.

Finals

ATP Challengers and ITF Futures

Singles: 3 (1 title, 2 runner-up)

Doubles: 10 (3 titles, 7 runner-ups)

References

External links

1999 births
Living people
Irish male tennis players
Tennis players from Dublin (city)
People from Mullingar